Hawkins Creek is a rural locality in the Shire of Hinchinbrook, Queensland, Australia.

Geography 
The locality is bounded to the south-east, south, south-west,and west by the Herbert River, and to the north-west loosely by the Mount Leach Range.

The northern half of the locality is within the Girrigun National Park, which extends into neighbouring Damrymple Creek and Rungoo.
 Gardiner Mountain 
 Mount Hawkins 
 South Gardiner Mountain 
It is predominantly used for growing sugarcane. A cane tramway passes through this area enabling the harvested sugarcane to be transferred to the Macknade Sugar Mill in Macknade for crushing.

History 
Warrgamay (also known as Waragamai, Wargamay, Wargamaygan, Biyay, and Warakamai) is an Australian Aboriginal language in North Queensland. The language region includes the Herbert River area, Ingham, Hawkins Creek, Long Pocket, Herbert Vale, Niagara Vale, Yamanic Creek, Herbert Gorge, Cardwell, Hinchinbrook Island and the adjacent mainland.

Hawkins Creek State School (sometimes written Hawkin's Creek State School) opened on 9 October 1912 and closed on 31 December 2003. It was at 18 Gortons Road.

The Catholic Church of the Holy Family opened in 1953. It was in Hawkins Creek Road.

Education 
There are no schools in Hawkins Creek. The nearest government primary and secondary schools are Ingham State School and Ingham State High School, both in neighbouring Ingham to the south.

References

Further reading 

 

Shire of Hinchinbrook
Localities in Queensland